Tara Kemp is the only studio album by U.S. singer/songwriter Tara Kemp. It was released on January 16, 1991 by Warner Bros. Records/Giant Records. It spawned two Top 10 singles on the U.S. Billboard Hot 100 chart, "Hold You Tight" (No. 3, 1991) and "Piece of My Heart" (No. 7, 1991). A third single, "Too Much", peaked at No. 95. Both of the album's Top 10 singles appeared on Billboard's Year-End chart for 1991: "Hold You Tight" at No. 25, "Piece of My Heart" at No. 84.

Track listing 
 "Prologue" 0:57 
 "Hold You Tight" (Jake Smith, Tuhin Roy, William Hammond) 4:44 
 "Be My Lover" (Jake Smith, Tuhin Roy) 5:05 
 "Too Much" (Jake Smith, Tuhin Roy) 4:57 
 "One Love" (Tara Kemp, William Hammond) 4:38 
 "Tara By The Way" (Hosh Gurelli, John London) 4:03 
 "Piece of My Heart" (Jake Smith, Tara Kemp, Tuhin Roy) 4:51 
 "Together" (Jake Smith, Tara Kemp, Tuhin Roy, William Hammond) 5:07 
 "The Way You Make Me Feel" (Jennifer Jones) 4:21 
 "Something To Groove To" (Jake Smith, Tuhin Roy) 2:50 
 "Monday Love" (Jake Smith, Tara Kemp, Tuhin Roy, William Hammond) 5:04 
 "Epilogue" 1:08

Singles 
 Hold You Tight October 31, 1990
 Piece of My Heart May 13, 1991
 Too Much July 1991

References 

1991 debut albums
Tara Kemp albums
Giant Records (Warner) albums